Pimp Lyrics & Dollar Signs is the second album by Sean T. It was released on November 5, 1996 for Young Gotti Records and was produced by Sean T and G-Man Stan.

Track listing
"Intro" - 0:36 
"Pimp Lyrics & Dollar Signs" - 4:24 
"Hit Da Corner" - 4:05 
"All It Takes" - 3:34 
"Somethin 2 Ride 2" - 4:31 
"All In A Niggas Look" - 4:26 
"Lyrical Trip" - 3:20 
"Another Jack" - 4:30 
"Reality" - 3:59 
"Ghetto Situations" - 3:53 
"Street Life" - 4:00
"Against The Grain" - 4:17 
"If You Only Knew" - 3:56 
"If It Ain't Gee" - 4:08 
"Way 2 Much On It" - 4:36 
"Somethin 2 Ride 2 (Radio)/Bonus Track" - 7:50

1996 albums
Sean T albums